Raymond Lugg (born 18 July 1948) is an English former professional footballer who played mainly as a midfielder for Middlesbrough, Watford, Plymouth Argyle, Crewe Alexandra and Bury during a 15-year career from the late 1960s through to 1980.

Lugg was born in Jarrow, and played for his hometown club, Jarrow Vikings, before joining Middlesbrough in 1965, where he helped them win promotion in 1968. Unable to retain a first-team place the following season, he was sold to Watford, who he also helped to promotion as well as helping reach an FA Cup semi-final in 1970 (beating Stoke City and Liverpool en route). He spent a season at Plymouth and then five years at Crewe, making 185 appearances. He was sold to Bury for £17,000, and later played for Chorley.

Lugg played a summer with Fort Lauderdale Strikers and was later a football coach in Fort Lauderdale in Florida.

References

1948 births
Living people
Crewe Alexandra F.C. players
Middlesbrough F.C. players
Watford F.C. players
Plymouth Argyle F.C. players
Bury F.C. players
Sportspeople from Jarrow
Footballers from Tyne and Wear
Association football midfielders
English footballers